Short track speed skating at the 2007 Winter Universiade was held from 23 to 26 January 2007.

Men's events

Women's events

Medals table

References 

Short track speed skating
Winter Universiade
Speed skating in Italy
2007